Bethlehem is a census-designated place and unincorporated community in Marshall County, Mississippi, United States.  Its ZIP code is 38659.

The community is located along Mississippi Highway 349, in the heart of Holly Springs National Forest.

Railroad executive Victor V. Boatner was born in Bethlehem, as was Naismith Basketball Hall of Fame member and civil rights advocate Chet Walker.

It was first named as a CDP in the 2020 Census which listed a population of 319.

Demographics

2020 census

Note: the US Census treats Hispanic/Latino as an ethnic category. This table excludes Latinos from the racial categories and assigns them to a separate category. Hispanics/Latinos can be of any race.

References

Unincorporated communities in Marshall County, Mississippi
Unincorporated communities in Mississippi
Census-designated places in Marshall County, Mississippi